Paul Matthes (6 March 1879 – 1948) was a German international footballer.

References

1879 births
1948 deaths
Association football forwards
German footballers
Germany international footballers